"The Echoing Green" (The Ecchoing Green) is a poem by William Blake published in Songs of Innocence in 1789. The poem talks about merry sounds and images which accompany the children playing outdoors. Then, an old man happily remembers when he enjoyed playing with his friends during his own childhood. The last stanza depicts the little ones being weary when the sun has descended and going to their mother to rest after playing many games.

The poem

Gallery
Scholarly editions all place "The Echoing Green"  as the sixth object in the print order for the Songs of Innocence and of Experience. The following, represents a comparison of several of the extant copies of the poem, their print date, their order in that particular printing of the poems, and their holding institution:

References

Works cited
 Oxford Student Study Guide, 'William Blake'.

External links
A Comparison of Extant copies of the original prints of  The Echoing Green available from the William Blake Archive

1789 poems
Songs of Innocence and of Experience